John Jeffrey Hitchmough (born 19 January 1962) is a former English cricketer.  Hitchmough was a right-handed batsman who bowled right-arm off break.  He was born in Liverpool, Lancashire.

Hitchmough made his debut for Cheshire in the 1983 MCCA Knockout Trophy against Hertfordshire.  Hitchmough played Minor counties cricket for Cheshire from 1983 to 1992, including 66 Minor Counties Championship matches and 20 MCCA Knockout Trophy matches.  In 1985, he made his List A debut against Yorkshire in the NatWest Trophy.  He played six further List A matches for Cheshire, the last of which came against Gloucestershire in the 1992 NatWest Trophy.  In his seven List A matches, he scored 66 runs at a batting average of 9.42, with a high score of 22.

References

External links
John Hitchmough at ESPNcricinfo
John Hitchmough at CricketArchive

1962 births
Living people
Cricketers from Liverpool
English cricketers
Cheshire cricketers